The 1968 New Mexico gubernatorial election took place on November 5, 1968, in order to elect the Governor of New Mexico. Incumbent Republican David Cargo ran for reelection to a second term. This election was the last in which the governor was elected to a two-year term, instead of to a four-year term. , this is the last time that Mora County and San Miguel County have voted for the Republican candidate.

Democratic primary
The Democratic primary was won by former state senator Fabian Chavez Jr.

Results

Republican primary
The Republican primary was won by Governor David Cargo.

Results

People's Constitutional Party nomination
Jose Maestes was the nominee of the People's Constitutional Party. He had replaced Reies Tijerina, who had been denied ballot access due to his status as a convicted felon.

General election

Results

References

1968
gubernatorial
New Mexico
November 1968 events in the United States